Oohalu Gusagusalade is an Indian Telugu-language soap opera that airs on Zee Telugu and streams on ZEE5. The series stars Akul Balaji and Roopa Shravan in lead roles. A remake of Zee TV's Hindi TV series Punar Vivaah - Zindagi Milegi Dobara, it started airing from 10 May 2021 and directed by Bheemagani Sreevardhan Reddy. The title of the series is adapted from the 2014 Telugu film Oohalu Gusagusalade.

Plot 
The story revolves around Abhiram, a widowed father of twin girls and Vasundhara, a divorced mother with a son.They both get a second chance to marry.Will they be able to lead a happy married life by parenting the three children?

Cast

Main 

 Akul Balaji as Abhiram "Abhi"; event manager
 Roopa Shravan as Vasundhara "Vasu"
 Karthik as Bunny; son of Vasundhara
 Baby Seetha as Keerthy; elder daughter of Abhiram
Baby Rithwika Sri as Keerthy; replaced by Baby seetha
 Baby Suhani as Anu; younger daughter of Abhiram
Baby Sanvi as Anu; replaced by Baby Suhani

Recurring 

 Anil Chowdary as Akhil; Abhiram's younger brother
 Shashikanth as Bhaskar; Abhiram's and Akhil's elder brother
 Shaik Mumtaz as Pavani; Bhaskar's wife
Padmini Jagadeesh as Jayanthi; Bhaskar. Abhi and Akhil's mother
Bose Babu as Ram Mohan; Bhaskar, Abhi and Akhil's father
Seetha as Susheela; mother of Vasundhara(Actually mother of her former husband)
Vara Prasad as Ram Prasad; father of Vasundhara(Actually father of her former husband)
 Naveena as Sumangali; paternal aunt of Abhiram
Priyanka as Harika; Akhil's wife.
Prasanna as Harika; Replaced by Priyanka
Bhavishya as Sravya
Prem Sagar as Harika's father
Sandhya Rani as Chamundeshwari; Harika's mother
Sumanasri as Abhi's first wife Sandhya's mother
Chittajallu Satya Prasad as Abhi's first wife Sandhya's father 
Shilpa Reddy as Pinky; vasu's friend
Dawood Proddatur as Raghu
CH Krishnaveni as Taayaru

Former Cast 

 Sunitha Manohar
Shiva Kumar as Anand
Kavitha as Vishalakshi
Padmavati as Sumati
Anusha Prathap as Guest Appearance at Mehandi Function
Sravani as Guest Appearance at Mehandi Function
Vishnu Priya as host (Guest Appearance) at Reception

Dubbed versions

References 

2021 Indian television series debuts
Zee Telugu original programming
Indian television soap operas
Telugu-language television shows
Indian romance television series
Indian drama television series